Shaun Hollamby (born 4 December 1965 in Pembury, Kent) is a British auto racing driver and race team owner. He is the managing director of AmD Tuning, a performance tuning company and motor racing team based in West Thurrock, Essex. He also currently competes in a part-time effort in the NASCAR Whelen Euro Series and Historic F3 and FFord.

In 2010–2013, he has run and driven a Volkswagen Golf in the British Touring Car Championship with various drivers for his own team AmD Tuning. AmD then switched to a Ford Focus in the BTCC in 2014–2015 with Dave Newsham and Mike Bushell and also an Audi S3 for Nicolas Hamilton in 2015. The following year would saw AmD ran Ollie Jackson in the Audi and Ant Whorton-Eales joined for 2017 in a second Audi. 2018 saw an expansion to also run 2x MG's alongside the Audis with Sam Smelt joining Ollie Jackson in the Audis and Rory Butcher and Tom Boardman driving the MG's. Currently, the team is running Sam Tordoff and Rory Butcher in Honda FK2 Civic Type R's and Jake Hill and Mark Blundell in the Audi S3's. The team ran Jake Hill and Sam Osborne in the Honda's in 2020 and Bobby Thompson and James Gornall in the Audi's under the Trade Price Cars banner. Hollamby completed a buyout/merger with Motorbase BTCC team for the 2021 season but the agreement for Hollamby to continue as Team Principal and joint owner was changed so Hollamby chose to step down from a full time role in the BTCC. He continues to work within the paddock as the presenter for the PITCH BTCC TV programme on the SKY channel, SportyStuff and also commentates on the F1 supporting Porsche SuperCup world feed.

Motorsport history
1978–85, Karting
1986, Formula Vee
1987–88, Formula First
1989, Multisport
1990, Formula Forward
1997–present, TV Director for Formula One Management (FOM)
2003–2005, Volkswagen Racing Cup
2008, Dunlop Sportmaxx Cup
2008–2010, European Time Attack
2010–2011, 2013 British Touring Car Championship (BTCC)
2015, British GT
2016, Britcar
2017, VW Cup and Britcar
2019-2020, NASCAR Whelen Euro Series
2021 Historic F3 and FFord

Personal life
He currently lives in London and has two daughters, Josie, Lottie and grandson, Brodie. He is married to Angie and has three step children Jamie, Max and Tara & her friend Ines.
Shaun's father, Olly, was also a successful racing driver, winning the 1977 and 1979 SuperVee Championships.

Racing record

Complete British Touring Car Championship results
(key) (Races in bold indicate pole position – 1 point awarded just in first race) (Races in italics indicate fastest lap – 1 point awarded all races) (* signifies that driver lead race for at least one lap – 1 point awarded all races)

Complete British GT Championship results
(key) (Races in bold indicate pole position) (Races in italics indicate fastest lap)

Complete NASCAR results

Whelen Euro Series – EuroNASCAR 2
(key) (Bold – Pole position. Italics – Fastest lap. * – Most laps led. ^ – Most positions gained)

References

External links
AmD Essex

1965 births
Living people
English businesspeople
People from Pembury
Formula One people
British Touring Car Championship drivers
British GT Championship drivers
NASCAR drivers
Britcar drivers